Søren Madsen (born 31 May 1976) is a Danish rower who won a bronze medal at the 2000 Summer Olympics with the Gold Four. He was born in Middelfart. In the 2000 Olympics, he was a member of the Danish boat which finished third in the lightweight coxless fours event.

References

1976 births
Living people
Danish male rowers
People from Middelfart Municipality
Olympic rowers of Denmark
Rowers at the 2000 Summer Olympics
Olympic bronze medalists for Denmark
Olympic medalists in rowing
Medalists at the 2000 Summer Olympics
World Rowing Championships medalists for Denmark
Sportspeople from the Region of Southern Denmark